Statistics of Primera Divisió in the 1998–99 season.

Overview
It was contested by 12 teams, and Principat won the championship.

League table

Results

References
Andorra - List of final tables (RSSSF)

Primera Divisió seasons
Andorra
1998–99 in Andorran football